Demos II is the second demo album by American rock band Hippo Campus. It was released on July 10, 2019 through Grand Jury Music and Transgressive Records.

Track listing

References 

2019 albums
Hippo Campus albums